Yuriy Lavrynenko is a retired Ukrainian association football midfielder who played professionally in the USL First Division and Major League Soccer.

Player

Youth
Lavrynenko began playing in the Dynamo Kyiv youth system when he was seven. In 1991, Lavrynenko's youth team played in a tournament in Rochester, New York. Several players were invited to move to Rochester. In 1992, Lavrynenko took the offer and moved to Chili, New York. During his four years attending Gates-Chili High School, he was an All State soccer player on a team which was the 1995 New York high school co-champion. Lavrynenko attended Indiana University, playing on the men's soccer team from 1996 to 1999.  In both 1998 and 1999, Lavrynenko scored the game-winning goal as the Hoosiers took back to back NCAA Division I Men's Soccer Championships.  He was a 1999 NCAA All American.

Professional
In February 2000, the Chicago Fire selected Lavrynenko in the third round (thirty-second overall) of the 2000 MLS SuperDraft.  During the 2000 season, he played three games with the Fire, going on loan to MLS Project 40, the Indiana Blast and the Milwaukee Rampage, all playing in the USL A-League.  When the Fire released him during the 2001 pre-season, the Rampage signed him to a three-year contract. The Rampage released him at the end of the season and in 2002, he joined the Rochester Rhinos. On June 25, 2004, the Rhinos released Lavrynenko. The Montreal Impact signed him two weeks later. He finished the season in Montreal, then retired.

Coach
In July 2009, Rochester Institute of Technology hired Lavrynenko as an assistant coach.

References

External links
 RIT profile
 
 NYSWSA: Yuriy Lavrynenko

Living people
1977 births
Footballers from Kyiv
Chicago Fire FC players
Indiana Hoosiers men's soccer players
Indiana Blast players
Major League Soccer players
Milwaukee Rampage players
Montreal Impact (1992–2011) players
Rochester New York FC players
Ukrainian footballers
Ukrainian expatriate footballers
A-League (1995–2004) players
MLS Pro-40 players
Expatriate soccer players in the United States
Expatriate soccer players in Canada
Chicago Fire FC draft picks
Association football midfielders
College men's soccer coaches in the United States
People from Chili, New York
Soccer players from New York (state)
Sportspeople from Rochester, New York
Ukrainian football managers
NCAA Division I Men's Soccer Tournament Most Outstanding Player winners